"Steel Guitar Rag" is the seminal Western swing instrumental credited with popularizing the steel guitar as an integral instrument in a Western band.

Written by Leon McAuliffe, it was first recorded by Bob Wills and The Texas Playboys in 1936. The song bears a striking resemblance to "Guitar Rag" recorded by guitarist Sylvester Weaver in 1927., although others have claimed stylistic similarities to a popular Hawaiian song, "On the Beach at Waikiki" (words, G.H. Stover; music, Henry Kailimai; arrangement, Sonny Cunha; 1915), which was widely performed on the vaudeville circuits in the U.S. Many musicians and bands have recorded this instrumental over the years. A recent version was performed by Country Music Hall of Famer Jimmy Russell.

References

Bibliography
Dempsey. John Mark. The Light Crust Doughboys Are on the Air: Celebrating Seventy Years of Texas Music. University of North Texas Press; Har/Com edition (September 2002) 
Harrington, Joe S. Sonic Cool: The Life & Death of Rock 'n' Roll. Hal Leonard, 2002. 
Komara, Edward. Encyclopedia of the Blues. Routledge, 2005) 
Koskoff, Ellen. Music Cultures in the United States: An Introduction. Routledge, 2005. 
Lange, Jeffrey J. Smile When You Call Me a Hillbilly: Country Music's Struggle for Respectability, 1939-1954. University of Georgia Press (August 2004) 
Oliphant, Dave. "Texas Jazz: 1920-50". The Roots of Texas Music edited by Lawrence Clayton, Joe W. Specht, pp. 37–65. Texas A&M University Press, 2005. 
Ruymar, Lorene. The Hawaiian Steel Guitar and Its Great Hawaiian Musicians. Centerstream Publications, 1996. 
Santoro, Gene. Stir It Up: Musical Mixes from Roots to Jazz. Oxford University Press, 1997. 
Stambler, Irwin; Grelun Land. Country Music: The Encyclopedia. St. Martin's Griffin, 2000. 
Townsend, Charles. San Antonio Rose: The Life and Music of Bob wills. University of Illinois Press, 1986.

External links
YouTube documentary

Western swing songs
1936 songs
Leon McAuliffe songs
Bob Wills songs